The following is a list of notable individuals who have publicy expressed support for or are working for the introduction of a universal basic income (UBI).

Europe 
 Dieter Althaus, German politician
 Tim Berners-Lee, World Wide Web inventor
 Julen Bollain, Spanish economist, politician and basic income researcher
 Robert Habeck, German politician
Winfried Kretschmann, German politician
 Frank Thelen, German entrepreneur and author
 Richard David Precht, German philosopher and author
 Harald Welzer, German social psychologist
 Maja Göpel, German political economist and sustainability scientist
 Gerald Hüther, German neurobiologist and author
Ranga Yogeshwar, Luxembourgish author and science journalist
Alan Watts, British writer
Louise Haagh, political theorist, form chair of the Basic Income Earth Network
 Rutger Bregman, Dutch author
 Angus Deaton, 2015 Nobel Prize Laureate in Economics
 André Gorz, Austrian-French social philosopher and journalist
 Benoit Hamon, candidate for President of France in 2017
 Timotheus Höttges, German manager
 Katja Kipping, The Left, Germany
 Caroline Lucas, British politician
 John McDonnell, British politician
 Antonio Negri, Italian Spinozistic-Marxist sociologist and political philosopher
 Philippe Van Parijs, Belgian philosopher
 Carole Pateman, feminist and political theorist
 Thomas Piketty, economist
 Christopher A. Pissarides, 2010 Nobel Prize Laureate in Economics
 Jonathan Reynolds, British politician
Jeremy Corbyn, British politician
 Molly Scott Cato, British politician, academic, environmental and community activist, and green economist
 Osmo Soininvaara, Finnish politician
 Guy Standing, British economist
 Aubrey de Grey, English author and biogerontologist
Yanis Varoufakis, former finance minister of Greece
 Björn Wahlroos, Finnish billionaire
 Susanne Wiest, German activist
 Pope Francis, pope of the Catholic Church
 Harald Lesch, German astrophysicist and author
 Thomas Straubhaar, Swiss economist
 Martin Wehrle, German journalist and author
 Michael Bohmeyer, German entrepreneur, author and activist
 Wolfgang Strengmann-Kuhn, German politician
Joe Kaeser, German manager
Giuseppe Conte, Italian jurist, politician and leader of the Five Star Movement
Jan Pieter Kuiper, Dutch professor of social medicine
Claus Offe, German sociologist
David Casassas, Spanish sociologist
Marcel Fratzscher, German economist
 Clive Lewis, British politician
Oswald Sigg, Swiss journalist
Georges-Louis Bouchez, Belgian politician and lawyer
, politician and member of the Deutscher Bundestag in 2012/13

United States and Canada 
 Aisha Nyandoro, CEO of Springboard to Opportunities, founder of Magnolia Mother's Trust
Karl Widerquist, political theorist and economist
 Peter Barnes, entrepreneur and environmentalist
 Keith Ellison, Attorney General of Minnesota, former U.S. Congressman and former DNC Deputy Chair
 James Baker, former U.S. Treasury Secretary
 Peter Diamond, 2010 Economics Nobel Prize winner
 Jack Dorsey, founder of Twitter
 Martin Feldstein, former Chair of the U.S. Council of Economic Advisers
 Henry Paulson, former U.S. Treasury Secretary
 Robert Reich, former U.S. Secretary of Labor
 Greg Mankiw, former Chair of the U.S. Council of Economic Advisers
 George P. Shultz, former U.S. Treasury Secretary
 Curtis Sliwa, activist, radio talk show host and Republican nominee for the 2021 New York City mayoral election
 Ted Halstead, policy entrepreneur
 Pierre Omidyar, founder of eBay
 Erik Olin Wright, Marxist sociologist
 Andrew Ng, computer scientist, statistician, and artificial intelligence researcher
 Tim Draper, venture capitalist 
 Sam Altman, Y Combinator president 
 Chris Hughes, co-founder of Meta Platforms 
 Dan Savage, LGBT activist
 Charles Murray, libertarian political scientist
 Bill Gross, financial manager 
 Robin Chase, co-founder of Zipcar 
 Andy Stern, former Service Employees International Union president 
 Elon Musk, business magnate 
 Ryan Holmes, Hootsuite CEO 
Joe Rogan, American podcast host 
 Paul Vallée, Pythian Group CEO  
 Naheed Nenshi, Mayor of Calgary
 Don Iveson, Mayor of Edmonton
 S. Robson Walton, former Walmart Chairman
 Andrew Yang, founder of Venture for America, and a 2020 Democratic presidential candidate
 Tulsi Gabbard, former U.S. Representative for Hawaii's 2nd congressional district, and a 2020 Democratic presidential candidate
Mark Zuckerberg, founder of Meta Platforms
 Jeff Bezos, founder of Amazon
Bill Gates, founder of Microsoft
Tim Cook, CEO of Apple
Larry Page, co-founder of Google
 Ray Kurzweil, American inventor and futurist
Neil deGrasse Tyson, American astrophysicist
Penn Jillette, American magician, actor, television presenter, and author
Jeremy Rifkin, American economic and social theorist
Erik Brynjolfsson, American author and inventor
Andrew McAfee, American research scientist
Timothy Leary, candidate for governor of California in 1969
Eugene McCarthy, candidate for president of the United States in 1968
Peter Diamandis, Greek-American entrepreneur
Albert Wenger, German-American businessman
 Guy Caron, Canadian politician
Peter Vallentyne, American academic
Hillel Steiner, Canadian political philosopher
Ben Goertzel, American AI researcher
Michael Tubbs, 79th Mayor of Stockton, California, later special adviser for economic mobility and opportunity for Governor Gavin Newsom
Aja Brown, 18th Mayor of Compton, California, initiator of the Compton Pledge
Edward Snowden, American whistleblower

Asia, Africa, Latin America, Oceania
 Eduardo Suplicy, Brazil 
 Kim Kataguiri, Brazilian Activist and Politician 
 Varun Gandhi, Indian Member of Parliament 
 Arvind Subramanian, present economic adviser in India
 Archbishop Desmond Tutu, 1984 Nobel Peace Prize Laureate, South Africa 
 Gareth Morgan, economist, New Zealand 
 Andrew Little, minister of Justice, New Zealand
Johann Rupert, South-African billionaire businessman
Lee Jae-myung, South Korean politician and leader of the Democratic Party of Korea
Yong Hye-in, South Korean politician of the Basic Income Party

Historical advocates

Eighteenth and nineteenth centuries
 Thomas Spence, an eighteenth century English radical, was apparently the first to lay out in full what is now called a universal basic income.

 Thomas Paine, a philosopher and one of the Founding Fathers of the United States, advocated a capital grant and an unconditional citizens pension in his 1797 pamphlet Agrarian Justice.

 American economist Henry George advocated a citizen's dividend paid for by a land value tax in an April 1885 speech at a Knights of Labor local in Burlington, Iowa titled "The Crime of Poverty" and later in an interview with former U.S. House Representative David Dudley Field II from New York's 7th congressional district published in the July 1885 edition of the North American Review.
William Morris, British socialist activist

Twentieth century

 Buckminster Fuller, architect
 Bertrand Russell, philosopher
 Huey Long, governor and US Senator from Louisiana, in his Share Our Wealth plan

 American economists James Tobin, Paul Samuelson, and John Kenneth Galbraith signed a document with 1,200 other economists in 1968 calling for the 90th U.S. Congress to introduce in that year a system of income guarantees and supplements.

 American economist Milton Friedman advocated a basic income in the form of a negative income tax in his 1962 book Capitalism and Freedom, and again in his 1980 book Free to Choose.

 Austrian economist Friedrich Hayek advocated a guaranteed minimum income in his 1944 book The Road to Serfdom, and reiterated his support in his 1973 book Law, Legislation and Liberty.

 Tony Atkinson - British economist, Centennial Professor at the London School of Economics, and senior research fellow of Nuffield College, Oxford.

 British economist James Meade

 C. H. Douglas - British engineer and pioneer of the social credit economic reform movement. 

 Civil rights leader Martin Luther King, Jr. endorsed it under the name of "the guaranteed income" in his 1967 book Where Do We Go from Here: Chaos or Community? shortly before his assassination.

 French politician Lionel Stoléru argued for UBI in 1974, remarking that it would provide “a means of suppressing and simplifying the entire current series of social programmes”.

 U.S. Senator George McGovern from South Dakota sponsored a bill proposed by the National Welfare Rights Organization to enact a $6,500 guaranteed minimum income, and in his 1972 presidential campaign, proposed replacing the personal income tax exemption with a $1,000 tax credit as a minimum-income floor for every citizen.

 Virginia Woolf, English writer

Twenty-first century
 Stephen Hawking, English theoretical physicist, cosmologist, and author
 Ailsa McKay, Scottish economist
 Götz Werner, founder, co-owner, and member of the advisory board of dm-drogerie markt

Notes

References